Bavaridan (also Romanized as Bāvarīdān and Bāwaridan) is a village in Jahliyan Rural District, in the Central District of Konarak County, Sistan and Baluchestan Province, Iran. At the 2006 census, its population was 229, in 50 families.

References 

Populated places in Konarak County